Kadoshkinsky District (Kadažeń ajmak; , Kadońbuje) is an administrative and municipal district (raion), one of the twenty-two in the Republic of Mordovia, Russia. It is located in the center of the republic. Its administrative center is the urban locality (a work settlement) of Kadoshkino. As of the 2010 Census, the total population of the district was 7,970, with the population of Kadoshkino accounting for 59.0% of that number.

History
The district was established on May 27, 1991.

Administrative and municipal status
Within the framework of administrative divisions, Kadoshkinsky District is one of the twenty-two in the republic. It is divided into one work settlement (an administrative division with the administrative center in the work settlement (inhabited locality) of Kadoshkino), and six selsoviets, all of which comprise twenty rural localities. As a municipal division, the district is incorporated as Kadoshkinsky Municipal District. Kadoshkino Work Settlement is incorporated into an urban settlement, and the six selsoviets are incorporated into six rural settlements within the municipal district. The work settlement of Kadoshkino serves as the administrative center of both the administrative and municipal district.

Notable residents 

Ivan Boldin (1892 in Vysokaya – 1965), senior Red Army general
Pavel Bulanov (1895–1938), NKVD officer

References

Notes

Sources

 
Districts of Mordovia
States and territories established in 1991